The Japan men's national under-21 volleyball team represents Japan in men's under-21 volleyball events, it is controlled and managed by the Japanese Volleyball Association that is a member of Asian volleyball body Asian Volleyball Confederation (AVC) and the international volleyball body government the Fédération Internationale de Volleyball (FIVB).

Results

FIVB U21 World Championship
 Champions   Runners up   Third place   Fourth place

Asian Men's U20 Volleyball Championship
 Champions   Runners up   Third place   Fourth place

Team

Current squad 
The following is the Japanese roster in the 2017 FIVB Volleyball Men's U21 World Championship.

Head coach: Tokunaga Fumitoshi

Notable players
 Masahiro Sekita (2012–2013)
 Naoya Takano (2012–2013)
 Yūki Ishikawa (2013–2014)
 Kentaro Takahashi (2013)
 Masaki Oya (2014)
 Taishi Onodera (2015)
 Issei Otake (2015)
 Kento Miyaura (2017)
 Kenta Takanashi (2015–2017)

See also 
 Japan men's national under-19 volleyball team
 Japan women's national under-20 volleyball team
 Japan men's national volleyball team

References

External links
Official website

National men's under-21 volleyball teams
Volleyball in Japan
Volleyball